The following is a list of Sites of Special Scientific Interest in the East Perth  Area of Search, in Scotland. For other areas, see List of SSSIs by Area of Search.

 Aldclune and Invervack Meadows
 Ardblair and Myreside Fens
 Ballyoukan Juniper Wood
 Beinn a' Ghlò
 Ben Vrackie
 Blair Atholl Meadow
 Brerachan Meadows
 Caenlochan
 Cairnleith Moss
 Cairnwell
 Cardney Wood
 Craig Tronach
 Craighall Gorge
 Craigs of Lundie and Ardgarth Loch
 Den of Airlie
 Den of Alyth
 Den of Riechip
 Drumochter Hills
 Drumore Loch
 Dun Moss
 Forest of Alyth Mires
 Forest of Clunie
 Fungarth Juniper Wood
 Glas Tulaichean
 Glen Fender Meadows
 Glen Garry
 Glen Tilt Woods
 Hare Myre Monk Myre and Stormont Loch
 Inchcoonans Claypit
 Inner Tay Estuary
 Kings Myre
 Kinnoull Hill
 Lairds Loch
 Loch Moraig
 Lochs Clunie and Marlee
 Lochs of Butterstone, Craiglush, Lowes
 Meikleour Area
 Milton Wood
 Pitarrig Meadow
 Pitlowie
 Romadie Wood
 Straloch Moraines
 Struan Wood
 Tay Bank Section
 Thistle Brig
 Tulach Hill
 Gallowflat Claypit  De-notified on 24 August 2012

 
East Perth
Geography of Perth, Scotland